Below Deck Mediterranean is an American reality television series which premiered on May 3, 2016 on Bravo. The show is the first spin-off of Below Deck. Similar to the original, the show chronicles the lives of the crew members who work and reside aboard a superyacht during charter season. It shows the crew as they deal with their personal issues in order to make their professional careers work. Every season ends with a special dedicated reunion episode of Watch What Happens Live! with Andy Cohen, in which the cast members discuss the events of the season.

Overview

Episodes

Season 1 (2016)

Season 2 (2017)

Season 3 (2018)

Season 4 (2019)

Season 5 (2020)

Season 6 (2021)

Season 7 (2022)

Notes

References

Below Deck (franchise)
Lists of reality television series episodes